CADSTAR is a Windows-based electronic design automation (EDA) software tool for designing and creating schematic diagrams and printed circuit boards (PCBs). It provides engineers with a tool for designing simple or complex, multilayer PCBs. CADSTAR spans schematic capture, variant management, placement, automatic and high-speed routing, signal integrity, power integrity, EMC analysis, design rule checks and production of manufacturing data.

Originally developed by U.K. PCB vendor Racal-Redac, CADSTAR has been part of the Zuken product portfolio since its acquisition in 1994. The software is developed at Zuken's Technology Centre, ZTC in Bristol, United Kingdom.

The basic features of CADSTAR can be tested with the free version of CADSTAR Express  or Schematic and PCB files produced by CADSTAR can be reviewed using the free CADSTAR Design Viewer.

History
The first version of CADSTAR was released in 1988 running under DOS. CADSTAR for Windows 1.0 was released in March 1994. Since then, there has been about one major release per year.  Zuken subsequently released eCADSTAR in 2019.

Modules
CADSTAR contains many modules for specific uses such as:

Design Editor This enables the engineer to draw schematic circuits, define the PCB layout and produce the manufacturing data from the completed PCB.
Library Editor Used for the creation of Symbols, Component and Parts. Supports ODBC compliant databases.
Embedded Router Used to create the tracks (layout) and other copper features of the board within the Design Editor environment.
P.R.Editor Used to create the tracks and other copper features of the board in an external environment to the Design Editor with many more features than the Embedded Router.
High-Speed P.R.Editor Allows the user to define a wide range of circuit rules and routing constraints to control the layout process.
Signal Integrity Verify Post-layout signal integrity simulation toolset and what-if analysis.
Power Integrity Fast analysis methodology including what-if analysis for concurrent power integrity.
EMC Adviser Helps designers predict, analyse and control EMC design issues.
Design Migration Tool Used to migrate designs and libraries from other EDA-tools into CADSTAR.
Variant Manager Allows support of variant assemblies for different part values or not fitted components on the same PCB.

See also

 Comparison of EDA software
 List of free electronics circuit simulators

References

External links
 

Electronic design automation software
Windows-only software